Vangueria venosa is a species of flowering plant in the family Rubiaceae. It is found in Mozambique, Eswatini and the former Transvaal region.

Taxonomy
This species is not to be confused with Vangueria venosa Hochst. ex A.Rich.. That species name was originally proposed as a synonym for Vangueria madagascariensis, but is therefore an illegitimate name.

References

External links 
 World Checklist of Rubiaceae

Flora of Mozambique
Flora of Swaziland
venosa
Taxa named by Otto Wilhelm Sonder